The Karababa Bridge is a road bridge between the Adıyaman and Şanlıurfa provinces crossing the Euphrates just downstream of the Atatürk Dam. The bridge carries the two-lane wide Şanlıurfa-Adıyaman roadway.

References

Road bridges in Turkey
Crossings of the Euphrates
Bridges over the Euphrates River